Afghanistan-Tajikistan Bridge or Tajikistan-Afghanistan Bridge or similar may refer to:

Tajik–Afghan bridge at Panji Poyon
Tajik–Afghan Friendship Bridge
Tajik–Afghan bridge at Tem-Demogan (2002)